Lieutenant General Sir Peter John Beale,  (born 18 March 1934) is a retired military physician. He was the Surgeon-General of the British Armed Forces from 1991 to 1994. He also served as the Chief Medical Adviser to the British Red Cross from 1994 to 2000.

Early life
Beale was born on 18 March 1934 to Basil and Eileen Beale. He was educated at St Paul's Cathedral School, a Private preparatory school in the City of London, and on a music scholarship at Felsted School, a public school in Felsted, Essex. Following his preclinical studies, he received a Bachelor of Arts from Gonville and Caius College, University of Cambridge, which he attended as a choral scholar. In 1958, he qualified by graduating Bachelor of Medicine, Bachelor of Surgery from Westminster Hospital Medical School.

Military career
On 7 June 1960, as part of National Service, Beale was commissioned into the Royal Army Medical Corps as a lieutenant. He was given the service number 465344. On 8 July 1960, he transferred from the national service list to a short service commission. He was given seniority in the rank of lieutenant from 26 October 1959, promoted to captain on 26 October 1960, and was the Regimental Medical Officer of 34 Light Anti Aircraft Regiment, Royal Artillery from 1960 to 1963. He transferred to a regular commission on 1 May 1963, was given seniority in the rank of captain from 26 October 1959, and was promoted to major on 26 October 1964. In 1971, having completed his medical training in the form of attaining Membership of the Royal College of Physicians, he was made an army consultant physician. He was promoted to lieutenant colonel on 26 October 1972.

Beale became commander of the medical force attached to the 2nd Division in 1981. He was promoted to colonel on 1 April 1982, by which point he had been elected to Fellowship of the Royal College of Physicians and attained a Diploma in Tropical Medicine and Hygiene. He was appointed Commander Medical, I Corps in 1984, and was promoted to brigadier on 28 January 1985 with seniority from 26 October 1984. He was appointed Commander Medical, United Kingdom Land Forces in 1987, and promoted to major general on 30 November, He served as Director General Army Medical Services from 1990 to 1993. and appointed Honorary Physician to the Queen on 21 December that same year.

Beale was promoted to lieutenant general on 1 October 1991, and served as Surgeon General of the British Armed Forces from 1991 to 1994. He was appointed a Commander of the Venerable Order of Saint John in 1991 and, in the 1992 New Year Honours, was made a Knight Commander of the Order of the British Empire. Beale retired from the British Army on 1 October 1994.

Later life
Upon leaving the British Army, Beale joined the British Red Cross as their Chief Medical Adviser. He held the post from 1994 to 2000. He was president of the Old Felstedian Society between 1998 and 2001, and the Army Officers Golf Society from 2001 to 2005.

Personal life
In 1959, Beale married Julia Mary Winter, a fellow doctor. Together they had four sons and two daughters. One of the daughters predeceased her father. One of their sons is the actor Sir Simon Russell Beale. In 2001, he married for a second time to Mary Elisabeth Williams, who has a daughter.

References

 

1934 births
Living people
People educated at St. Paul's Cathedral School
People educated at Felsted School
Alumni of Gonville and Caius College, Cambridge
Fellows of the Royal College of Physicians
Royal Army Medical Corps officers
British Army lieutenant generals
Surgeons-General of the British Armed Forces
20th-century English medical doctors
Commanders of the Order of St John